Cristofor Segni (1604–1661) was a Roman Catholic prelate who served as Titular Archbishop of Thessalonica (1645–1661).

Biography
Cristofor Segni was born in Bologna, Italy in 1604.
On 24 April 1645, he was appointed during the papacy of Pope Innocent X as Titular Archbishop of Thessalonica.
On 11 February 1646, he was consecrated bishop by Giovanni Giacomo Panciroli, Cardinal-Priest of Santo Stefano al Monte Celio, with Alfonso Gonzaga, Titular Archbishop of Rhodus, and Girolamo Farnese, Titular Archbishop of Patrae, serving as co-consecrators. 
He served as Titular Archbishop of Thessalonica until his death on 8 July 1661.

Episcopal succession
While bishop, he was the principal co-consecrator of:
Alessandro Tassi, Bishop of Terracina, Priverno e Sezze (1646); 
Lorenzo Pollicini, Bishop of Avellino e Frigento (1653); 
Nicolaus Carpenia, Archbishop of Durrës (1657); 
Carlo Roberti de' Vittori, Titular Archbishop of Tarsus (1658); and 
Odoardo Vecchiarelli, Bishop of Rieti (1660).

References

External links and additional sources
 (for Chronology of Bishops (for Chronology of Bishops) 
 (for Chronology of Bishops (for Chronology of Bishops) 

17th-century Italian Roman Catholic titular archbishops
Bishops appointed by Pope Innocent X
1604 births
1661 deaths